Miguel Angel Marini (born 1927) was de facto Governor of Córdoba, Argentina from 2 February 1979 to 8 March 1979.

References

External links

1927 births
Possibly living people
Place of birth missing (living people)
Governors of Córdoba Province, Argentina